Jean-Claude Grumberg (born 1939) is a French playwright and author of children's books.

Early life 

Before becoming a playwright, Jean-Claude Grumberg held several jobs, including working as a tailor. This work provided the setting for his best-known play, L'Atelier. He discovered drama as an actor in a theatrical company. His career as a writer began in 1968 with Demain, une fenêtre sur rue, and short theatrical pieces such Rixe, which was staged at the Comédie-Française. In several of his works, he has written about what has haunted him since childhood: the death of his father in the Nazi death camps: Maman revient pauvre orphelin, Dreyfus (1974), L'Atelier (1979) and Zone libre (1990).

In 1998, L'Atelier returned to Théâtre Hébertot in Paris, achieved great success, and won the 1999 Molière for best play direction.

His screenplay credits include, Les Années Sandwiches, coauthor with François Truffaut of The Last Metro, La Petite Apocalypse of Costa-Gavras, Le Plus Beau Pays du monde by Marcel Bluwal (1999), Fait d'hiver Robert Enrico (1999). For television, he wrote the teleplays for Thérèse Humbert, Music Hall, by Marcel Bluwal, Les Lendemains qui chantent, by Jacques Fansten et Julien l'apprenti, by Jacques Otmezguine.

He is one of the few living contemporary French playwrights whose work is studied in schools (including L'Atelier). Jean-Claude Grumberg received the Grand Prize of the Académie française in 1991 and SACD Prize in 1999 for lifetime achievement; the Molière's best playwright in 1991 for Zone libre and in 1999 for L'Atelier.

Jean-Claude Grumberg is also the father of the actress Olga Grumberg.

Actor  
 1963: La Grande Oreille by Pierre-Aristide Breal, directed Jacques Fabbri, Théâtre de Paris
 1964: L'Aquarium d'Aldo Nicolai, directed Jacques Fabbri, Théâtre de Paris
 1965: La Grande Oreille by Pierre-Aristide Breal, directed Jacques Fabbri, Théâtre de Paris
 1965:  L'Envers d'une conspiration by Alexandre Dumas, directed Jacques Fabbri, Théâtre de Paris
 1973: En r'venant de l'expo Jean-Claude Grumberg, directed Jean-Pierre Vincent Théâtre Ouvert, Festival d'Avignon Odéon Theatre, Théâtre National de Strasbourg
 1982: Night and Day by Tom Stoppard, directed Jacques Rosner, House of Culture André Malraux Reims, Nouveau Théâtre de Nice
 1990: Zone libre by Jean-Claude Grumberg, directed Maurice Benichou Théâtre national de la Colline

Works 
 Plays
Sortie au théâtre
L'Atelier
Les Vacances
Rixe
Les Rouquins
À qui perd gagne
Adam et Ève
Le Duel (after Chekhov)
Conversation avec mon père
Amorphe d'Ottenburg
Linge sale
Rêver peut-être
Demain une fenêtre sur rue
En r'venant d'l'expo
L'Indien sous Babylone
Maman revient, pauvre orphelin
Quatre commémorations
Dreyfus (1974), interprété par Maurice Chevit et Claude Dauphin
Zone libre
Michu
La Vocation
Pinok et Barbie
Marie des grenouilles
Iq et Ox
Mon Père. Inventaire
Une leçon de savoir-vivre
L'Enfant Do
Les Courtes
La Nuit tous les chats sont gris
Quatre Pièces courtes
Le Petit Violon
Chez Pierrot
Les Autres
Ca va ?
Vers Toi Terre promise, Tragédie dentaire
Moi je crois pas !

 Scenarios
 1975: Le Petit Marcel by Jacques Fansten
 1980: The Last Metro by François Truffaut
 1988: Les Années Sandwiches by Pierre Boutron
 1993: La Petite Apocalypse of Costa Gavras
 1999: Le Plus Beau Pays du monde by Marcel Bluwal
 1999: Fait d'hiver by Robert Enrico
 2002: Amen. of Costa Gavras
 2005: The Axe of Costa Gavras
 2015: The Art Dealer of François Margolin

 Pieces for Children
Le Petit Violon
Marie des grenouilles
Pinok et Barbie
Iq et Ox
Le Petit Chaperon Uf
Mange ta main

Awards 
 Molières
 1988 Molière adapter for Death of a Salesman
 1991 Molière author for  Free zone
 1995 Molière adapter for Another Love Story
 1998 nomination Molière author for Adam and Eve
 1999 Molière author for The Workshop
 1999 Molière for best play directory L'Atelier
 2002 nomination Molière adapter for Conversations avec mon père
 2009 Molière author for To you promised land
 Award Union criticism 1974 (best creation of a play in French), Price of Pleasure SACD and Price's Theater Dreyfus.
 Award Union criticism 1979 (best creation of a play in French) and Ibsen Prize for L'Atelier.
 Award Union criticism 1999 (best creation of a play in French) for Rêver peut-être
 Award Union criticism 2009 (best creation of a play in French) for Vers toi terre promise, tragédie dentaire
 1991 Grand Prix du Théâtre de l’Académie française for Zone libre
 1999 SACD Prize for all of his work
 César Awards 2003 César Award for Best Screenplay for Amen. of Costa Gavras

External links 
 
In the Aftermath of War, Reconstructing Their Lives New York Times

1939 births
Male actors from Paris
French male stage actors
French people of Romanian-Jewish descent
20th-century French dramatists and playwrights
Living people
21st-century French male actors
20th-century French male actors
French male screenwriters
French screenwriters